Brash may refer to:

 Brash (surname), including a list of people with the name
 Brash, a term applied to some accumulations of fragments:
the loose rubble found in the lowest layer of the soil
an accumulation of drift ice fragments
 Water brash, hypersalivation secondary to gastroesophageal reflux disease
 Brash Entertainment, a video game company
 Thomas Brash Morison (1868-1945), Scottish politician and judge
 Olof the Brash
 Sekolah Menengah Teknik Ipoh Persiaran Brash

See also 
 Brasch
 Brasher (disambiguation)
 Brash Island in Antarctica